Stauffer is an unincorporated community in central Alberta within Clearwater County, located  north of Highway 54,  west of Red Deer.

Localities in Clearwater County, Alberta